Dakoro Department may refer to:
Dakoro Department, Burkina Faso
Dakoro Department, Niger

Department name disambiguation pages